Harry Clay (1881–1964) was an English footballer.

Harry Clay may also refer to:
Henry "Harry" Clay (1849–1884), see Clay family
Harry Clay (showman), associate of Jim Gerald in 1920s
Harry Clay (businessman) on 1952 Birthday Honours

See also
Harold Clay (1886–1961), British trade unionist
Henry Clay (disambiguation)